The Ikhwan revolt was an uprising in the Arabian Peninsula from 1927 to 1930 led by the Ikhwan. It began in 1927, when the tribesmen of the Otaibah, Mutayr and Ajman rebelled against the authority of Ibn Saud and engaged in cross-border raids into parts of Transjordan, Mandatory Iraq and the Sheikhdom of Kuwait. The relationship between the House of Saud and the Ikhwan deteriorated into an open bloody feud in December 1928. The main instigators of the rebellion were defeated in the Battle of Sabilla, on 29 March 1929. Ikhwan tribesmen and troops loyal to Abdulaziz clashed again in the Jabal Shammar region in August 1929, and Ikhwan tribesmen attacked the Awazim tribe on 5 October 1929. Faisal Al Dawish, the main leader of the rebellion and the Mutair tribe, fled to Kuwait in October 1929 before being detained by the British and handed over to Ibn Saud. Faisal Al-Dawish would die in Riyadh on 3 October 1931 from what appears to have been a heart condition. Government troops had finally suppressed the rebellion on 10 January 1930, when other Ikhwan rebel leaders surrendered to the British. In the aftermath, the Ikhwan leadership was slain, and the remains were eventually incorporated into regular Saudi units. Sultan bin Bajad, one of the three main Ikhwan leaders, was killed in 1931, while Al Dawish died in prison in Riyadh on 3 October 1931.

Background

At the beginning of the 20th century, Arabia was an arena of tribal wars, which had eventually led to unification under the leadership of Al Saud. The main tool for achieving these conquests was the Ikhwan, the Wahhabist-Bedouin tribal army led by Sultan bin Bajad and Faisal Al Dawish. From the Saudi core in Nejd, and aided by the collapse of the Ottoman Empire after the First World War, the Ikhwan had completed the conquest of the territory that was to become Saudi Arabia by the end of 1925. On 10 January 1926 Abdulaziz declared himself King of the Hejaz and, then, on 27 January 1927 he took the title of King of Nejd (his previous title had been 'Sultan').

Undermining the authority of Ibn Saud

After the conquest of the Hejaz, some Ikhwan leaders wanted to continue the expansion of the Wahhabist realm into the British protectorates of Transjordan, Iraq and Kuwait. The tribesmen had already tried to gain territory in the Kuwait-Najd Border War and raids on Transjordan, but they suffered heavy casualties. Defying Ibn Saud, elements of the Ikhwan, mainly consisting of the Mutair tribe under al-Dawish, launched a raid on southern Iraq on 5 November 1927, clashing with Iraqi troops near Busaiya, resulting in some 20 casualties on both sides. One of the reasons for the revolt was the establishment of a police fort in Busaiya. 
Elements of the Ikhwan also raided Kuwait in January 1928. On both occasions, they looted camels and sheep. Though they raided brutally, they suffered heavy retaliation from the British Royal Air Force (RAF) and Kuwaitis. 

In order to settle the issue a meeting, Al Jam'iyah Al 'Umumiyah (the General Assembly or the Al Riyadh Conference), was held by Ibn Saud in Riyadh in November 1928. The participants were 800 individuals including several tribe and clan leaders who were part of Ikhwan and significant members of religious body or ulema. 

In January 1929, an Ikhwan raid on the Sheikhdom of Kuwait resulted in the killing of an American missionary, Dr. Bilkert, who was traveling by car with another American, the philanthropist Charles Crane. With no signs of Ibn Saud mobilizing his forces to rein in the Ikhwan and stop the raids, RAF resources were extended to Kuwait.

Open revolt
Ibn Saud, however, refused to agree to the wild Ikhwani raids. Although the Ikhwan had been taught that all non-Wahabbis were infidels, Abdul-Aziz was well aware that the few parts of central Arabia not part of his realm had treaties with London. He himself had just won British recognition as an independent ruler only a year earlier and recognized the danger of a direct conflict with the British. The Ikhwan therefore openly revolted in December 1928.

Battle of Sabilla

The largest confrontation of the parties occurred in 1929, known as Battle of Sabilla, where the Ikhwan leadership were killed. The battle started in the early hours on 31 March 1929. It lasted only for one hour due to evident superiority of forces of Ibn Saud.

The Battle of Sabilla was the last major battle of camel raiders, thus having historic importance. It had become a scene of carnage for the technologically mediocre Ikhwan against the cavalry and machine-guns of Ibn Saud's army. In the aftermath of the battle some 500 Ikhwan tribesmen died, whereas Ibn Saud's losses were about 200.

Battle of Jabal Shammar

Ikhwan-affiliated tribesmen and loyal Saudi troops clashed again in the Jabal Shammar region in August 1929, resulting in the deaths of some 1,000 men.

Attack on Awazim tribe
Despite their losses, the remnant of the Ikhwan tribesmen went on with their rebellion by attacking the Awazim tribe in Arabia on 5 October 1929, resulting in the deaths of some 250 individuals. eventually ending the Ikhwan regime

Final accords
Faisal Al Dawish fled to Kuwait in October 1929, and government troops finally suppressed the rebellion on 10 January 1930, when Ikhwan rebel leaders surrendered to the British.

Aftermath

In the aftermath, the Ikhwan leadership was slain, and the remains were eventually incorporated into regular Saudi units. Sultan bin Bajad, one of the main Ikhwan leaders, was killed in 1931, whereas Faisal Al Dawish died in prison in Riyadh on 3 October 1931.

In September 1932, the two kingdoms of Hejaz and Nejd were united as the Kingdom of Saudi Arabia.

See also
 Grand Mosque Seizure
 Adwan Rebellion
 Kura Rebellion
 Iraqi Shia revolts 1935–1936

References

1927 in Asia
1928 in Asia
1929 in Asia
1930 in Asia
Wars involving Saudi Arabia
Conflicts in 1927
Conflicts in 1928
Conflicts in 1929
Conflicts in 1930
History of Saudi Arabia
Saudi Arabian rebels
Ikhwan